The North Circular Road, designated as the R101 regional road, is an important thoroughfare on the northside of Dublin, in Ireland. It is the northside equivalent of the South Circular Road.

Location
The regional road was constructed as the northern boundary of the city, and was laid out with the South Circular Road in 1763. It is still considered to separate the city centre from the inner suburbs. It runs from the Phoenix Park in the west through Phibsboro, to North Wall in the east. A number of important institutions are located along the road, including the Mater Hospital, Dalymount Park and Mountjoy Prison, and both Croke Park and St. Brendan's Hospital are nearby. The majority of the original, large Victorian red brick houses have been converted into flats or apartments.

The R101 and the NCR overlap for most of their lengths, and the entire NCR forms a section of the R101. In the west the R101 connects the NCR to Parkgate Street via the short Infirmary Road ; at the eastern end the R101 becomes Portland Row after the junction with Summerhill. It continues the northern loop through Saville Place , then turning east for its final kilometre via Sheriff Street (Upper) before terminating at North Wall Road (the R131).

The official description of the R101 from the Roads Act 1993 (Classification of Regional Roads) Order 2012  reads:

R101: North Circular Road, Dublin

Between its junction with R109 at Parkgate Street and its junction with R147 at Dalymount via Infirmary Road and North Circular Road all in the city of Dublin

and

between its junction with R135 at Berkeley Road and its junction with R131 at East Wall Road via North Circular Road, Portland Row, Seville Place, Sheriff Street Lower and Sheriff Street Upper all in the city of Dublin.

Buildings

At Hanlon's Corner, there is one of the largest office blocks built in Dublin in the 20th century, Park House. Built in the site of the Kirwan House orphanage, the block is 7-stories over a raised basement car park. It was originally planned to be a hotel but was abandoned in 1969, with the almost completed reinforced concrete structure converted to office use. This was completed in 1973. It was leased to a number of tenants, including the Department of Justice, Special Olympics Ireland, the Northern Area Health Board and the Mirror Group. In 2017, the buildings was purchased by the Technological University Dublin to incorporate into the Grangegorman campus.

See also
Regional road (Ireland)
Roads in Ireland
List of streets and squares in Dublin

References

Sources

 

Regional roads in the Republic of Ireland
Roads in Dublin (city)
Streets in Dublin (city)